André Jean René Lacrampe, Ist. del Prado (17 December 1941 – 15 May 2015) was the Roman Catholic Archbishop of Besançon.  

He was born on 17 December 1941 in Agos-Vidalos, a commune in the Hautes-Pyrénées department in south-western France. He was ordained as a priest in 1967 for the Prado Institute, an Institute of Consecrated Life. On 16 October 1983 he was ordained the Titular Bishop of Legia and was appointed Auxiliary Bishop of Reims. From 1 October 1988 he was Prelate of Mission de France at Pontigny, France until he became Bishop of Ajaccio on 5 January 1995. He was appointed Archbishop of Besançon on 13 August 2003 and retired from that position on 25 April 2013. 

He was made an Officer of the Legion of Honour in 2009, and Chevalier dans l’Ordre des Palmes académiques in 2011. He died in May 2015.

References

Archbishops of Besançon
1941 births
2015 deaths
Chevaliers of the Ordre des Palmes Académiques
People from Hautes-Pyrénées
Officiers of the Légion d'honneur
Auxiliary bishops of Reims
Bishops of Ajaccio